Johan 'Joe' Snyman (born 9 July 1986) is a South African rugby union player, currently playing with French team .

He was born in Evander, but went to Outeniqua High School in George. He was also called up to the South Africa Under 19 squad for the 2005 Under 19 Rugby World Championship, which was won by South Africa.

He made 11 appearances for the  Vodacom Cup and Currie Cup sides. They then sent him to the International Rugby Academy in New Zealand, where he also had a short spell at New Zealand ITM Cup team Hawke's Bay Magpies.

On 5 September 2012, he joined Welsh team Scarlets for the 2012–2013 season on a three-year contract.

On 8 June 2015, Snyman joins Top 14 club CA Brive in France from the 2015–2016 season.

References

1986 births
Living people
People from Govan Mbeki Local Municipality
South African rugby union players
Eastern Province Elephants players
Sharks (Currie Cup) players
Golden Lions players
Rugby union locks
Scarlets players
Rugby union players from Mpumalanga